The Nanaimo Islanders were a junior ice hockey team based in Nanaimo, British Columbia that played one season in the Western Hockey League in 1982–83.  They played at Frank Crane Arena. The team relocated to New Westminster, British Columbia before settling in Kennewick, Washington as the Tri-City Americans. The franchise was an original WCHL team, forming in 1966 as the Calgary Buffaloes, later the Centennials. It moved to Nanaimo in 1982 after spending five years as the Billings Bighorns.

Season-by-season record

Note: GP = Games played, W = Wins, L = Losses, T = Ties Pts = Points, GF = Goals for, GA = Goals against

NHL alumni

See also
List of ice hockey teams in British Columbia

References
2005–06 WHL Guide
hockeydb.com

Defunct Western Hockey League teams
Defunct ice hockey teams in British Columbia
Sport in Nanaimo
1982 establishments in British Columbia
Ice hockey clubs established in 1982
Ice hockey clubs disestablished in 1983
1983 disestablishments in British Columbia